Angostura bitters is a concentrated bitters (herbal alcoholic preparation) based on gentian, herbs, and spices, produced by House of Angostura in Trinidad and Tobago. It is typically used for flavouring beverages or, less often, food. The bitters were first produced in the town of Angostura (now Ciudad Bolívar, Venezuela), hence the name, but do not contain angostura bark. The bottle is recognisable by its distinctive oversized label. Angostura is Spanish for 'narrowing', the town of Angostura having been at the first narrowing of the Orinoco River.

Beverages named "Angostura Bitter" or "Angobitter" are also offered from other brands (e.g., Riemerschmid, Hemmeter). Unlike the House of Angostura product, they contain angostura bark, possibly to justify the use of the word "Angostura" in their names.

History

Siegert began to sell it in 1824 and established a distillery for the purpose in 1830. Siegert was based in the town of Angostura (afterward renamed Ciudad Bolivar) and used locally available ingredients, perhaps aided by botanical knowledge of the local Amerindians. The product was sold abroad from 1853, and in 1875 manufacturing  moved from Ciudad Bolivar to Port of Spain, Trinidad, where it remains. 

Angostura won a medal at the Weltausstellung 1873 Wien, a World's Fair held that year in Vienna. The medal is still depicted on the oversized label, along with the reverse, which shows Emperor Franz Joseph I of Austria in profile.

The exact formula is a closely guarded secret, with only one person knowing the whole recipe, passed familialy.

Since 2007, Angostura has also produced Angostura Orange, an orange bitters with bright floral notes and fresh orange peel. Angostura Orange has not dominated the orange bitters market in the same way that its aromatic bitters have become an essential product for bars and consumers.

In 2009 there was a shortage of Angostura bitters; the company reported that the primary problem was a shortage of bottles. There were incorrect rumours of a product recall, or that production of the bitters had stopped at the plant in Trinidad. The shortage of bitters was the subject of many news articles and blogs, particularly in the cocktail industry.

Uses
Angostura bitters are extremely concentrated and may be an acquired taste; though 44.7% alcohol by volume, bitters are not normally ingested undiluted, but instead are used in small amounts as flavouring.

Medicinal
Angostura bitters are alleged to have restorative properties. Angostura brand bitters is often incorrectly believed to have poisonous qualities because it is associated with angostura bark (which it does not contain), which, although not toxic, during its use as a medicine was often adulterated by unscrupulous sellers, who padded out the sacks of bark with cheaper, poisonous Strychnos nux-vomica or copalchi bark. Angostura is still often used by Trinidadians to treat digestive problems, under the assumption that the ingredient gentian may aid indigestion.

Cocktails
Angostura bitters are a key ingredient in many cocktails. Originally used to help with upset stomachs of the soldiers in Simón Bolívar's army, it later became popular in soda water and was usually served with gin. The mix stuck in the form of a pink gin, and is also used in many other cocktails such as long vodka, consisting of vodka, bitters, and lemonade. In the United States, it is best known for its use in whiskey cocktails: old fashioneds, made with whiskey, bitters, sugar, and water, and Manhattans, made usually with rye whiskey and red vermouth. In a pisco sour, a few drops are sprinkled on top of the foam, both for aroma and decoration. In a champagne cocktail, a few drops of bitters are added to a sugar cube.

In Hong Kong, Angostura bitters are included in the local gunner cocktail. Though not in the classic recipe, bartenders sometimes add more flavour to the mojito cocktail by sprinkling a few drops of Angostura bitters on top. Bitters can also be used in "soft" drinks; a common drink served in Australian and New Zealand pubs is lemon, lime and bitters. In Malawi, and many other countries, bitters are added to a mix of crushed ice, ginger ale, and Sprite to make a rock shandy.

Among certain bartending communities (especially in Malaysia), shots of Angostura are taken as the "bartender's handshake" either during or after the shift is done.

The largest purveyor of Angostura bitters in the world is Nelsen's Hall Bitters Pub on Washington Island off the northeast tip of Door Peninsula in Door County, Wisconsin. The pub began selling shots of bitters as a "stomach tonic for medicinal purposes" under a pharmaceutical license during Prohibition in the United States. The practice, which helped the pub to become the oldest continuously operating tavern in Wisconsin, remained a tradition after the repeal of Prohibition. As of 2018, the pub hosts a Bitters Club, incorporates bitters into food menu items, and sells upwards of 10,000 shots per year.

Popular recipes

 Brut cocktail
 Champagne cocktail
 Cuba Libre
 Fallen angel
 Gunner
 Lemon, lime and bitters
 Manhattan
 Old fashioned
 Pink gin
 Pisco sour
 Prince of Wales
 Rum punch
 Queen's Park Swizzle
 Rob Roy
 Singapore sling
 Trinidad Sour
 Zombie

See also
 Gentian
 Meinhard's Bitters
Peychaud's Bitters

References

Further reading
 Angostura Bitters Drink Guide, a promotional booklet of 1908, reprinted in 2008 with a new introduction by Ross Bolton.

External links
 Official website

Bitters
Drink companies of Trinidad and Tobago
Patent medicines
Spices
Trade secrets
Venezuelan cuisine